Splendora is a city in Montgomery County, Texas, United States. The population was 1,683 at the 2020 census.  Splendora was named in reference to the "splendor of its floral environment."

History
In the late 1800s, The Houston, East and West Texas Railway (now the Union Pacific Railroad), at the suggestion of Charles Cox, decided to build a narrow-gauge spur at the location of what is now Splendora. The location was originally known as "Cox's Switch." The area slowly grew more populated after W.W. Burrow built a general store in the area in 1883. In 1896, Cox recommended to the town's postmaster, Milton Z. King, that the town's name should be changed. They decided to change the name to Splendora because of the "splendor of its floral environment." The town was incorporated in December 1966.

Geography

Splendora is located at  (30.220237, –95.167232), which is approximately 37 miles North-North-East of Houston, Texas.

Demographics

As of the 2020 United States census, there were 1,683 people, 641 households, and 519 families residing in the city.

As of the 2010 United States Census, there were 1,615 people, 548 households, and 306 families residing in the city. The racial makeup of the city was 92.6% White, 1.1% African American, 0.2% Native American, 0.7% Asian, 3.3% from other races, and 2.0% from two or more races. Hispanic or Latino of any race were 9.8% of the population.

There were 548 households, out of which 39.2% had children under the age of 18 living with them, 55.8% were married couples living together, 14.2% had a female householder with no husband present, and 23.4% were non-families. 17.9% of all households were made up of individuals. The average household size was 2.95 and the average family size was 3.33.

In the city, the population was spread out, with 30.8% under the age of 18, 8.7% from 18 to 24, 28.3% from 25 to 44, 21.3% from 45 to 64, and 8.7% who were 65 years of age or older. The median age was 32.6 years. For every 100 females, there were 91.8 males. For every 100 females age 18 and over, there were 88.9 males.

According to the 2015 American Community Survey, The median income for a household in the city was $37,431 and the median income for a family was $38,542. Males had a median income of $27,763 versus $16,809 for females. The per capita income for the city was $19,609. About 25.8% of families and 31.5% of the population were below the poverty line, including 53.3% of those under age 18 and 9.7% of those age 65 or over.

Government and infrastructure

Splendora is governed locally by a City Council consisting of a mayor and 5 council members. As of June 2022, the mayor is Dorothy Welch. Council members are William Ramey, Evelyn Myers, Mike Clark, Sharon Ipes, and William Usher.

In the Texas State Senate, Splendora is part of District 4, represented by Republican Brandon Creighton. In the Texas House of Representatives, Splendora is part of District 16, represented by Republican Will Metcalf.

In the United States Senate, Republicans John Cornyn and Ted Cruz represent the entire state of Texas. In the United States House of Representatives, Splendora is part of District 8, represented by Republican Kevin Brady.

The United States Postal Service Splendora Post Office is located at 26130 Farm to Market Road 2090 East.

Education

Children who live in Splendora attend schools within the Splendora Independent School District.

The Texas Legislature designated Splendora ISD (and therefore Splendora) as part of Lone Star College (originally the North Harris Montgomery Community College District). The territory in Splendora ISD joined the community college district in 1996.

Notable people

 Robbie Middleton, burn survivor and crime victim
 Brian Robison, National Football League player
 James Surls, Modernist artist

References

External links

 Handbook of Texas Online article

Cities in Montgomery County, Texas
Cities in Texas
Greater Houston